The Aptian is an age in the geologic timescale or a stage in the stratigraphic column. It is a subdivision of the Early or Lower Cretaceous Epoch or Series and encompasses the time from 121.4 ± 1.0 Ma to 113.0 ± 1.0 Ma (million years ago), approximately. The Aptian succeeds the Barremian and precedes the Albian, all part of the Lower/Early Cretaceous.

The Aptian partly overlaps the upper part of the Western European Urgonian Stage.

The Selli Event, also known as OAE1a, was one of two oceanic anoxic events in the Cretaceous Period, which occurred around 120 Ma and lasted approximately 1 to 1.3 million years, being marked by enhanced silicate weathering, as well as ocean acidification. The Aptian extinction was a minor extinction event hypothesized to have occurred around 116 to 117 Ma.

Stratigraphic definitions
The Aptian was named after the small city of Apt in the Provence region of France, which is also known for its crystallized fruits. The original type locality is in the vicinity of Apt. The Aptian was introduced in scientific literature by French palaeontologist Alcide d'Orbigny in 1840.

The base of the Aptian Stage is laid at magnetic anomaly M0r. A global reference profile for the base (a GSSP) had in 2009 not yet been appointed. The top of the Aptian (the base of the Albian) is at the first appearance of coccolithophore species Praediscosphaera columnata in the stratigraphic record.

Subdivision
In the Tethys domain, the Aptian contains eight ammonite biozones:
 zone of Hypacanthoplites jacobi
 zone of Nolaniceras nolani
 zone of Parahoplites melchioris
 zone of Epicheloniceras subnodosocostatum
 zone of Duffrenoyia furcata
 zone of Deshayesites deshayesi
 zone of Deshayesites weissi
 zone of Deshayesites oglanlensis

Sometimes the Aptian is subdivided in three substages or subages: Bedoulian (early or lower), Gargasian (middle) and Clansayesian (late or upper). In modern formal chronostratigraphy the Aptian is divided into Lower and Upper sub-stages. The Lower Aptian is equivalent to the Bedoulian, and it includes the oglanensis to furcata Tethyan ammonite zones.  The Upper Aptian is equivalent to the Gargasian and Clansayesian, it includes the subnodosocostatum to jacobi Tethyan ammonite zones (Gradstein et al. 2004).

Lithostratigraphic units

Examples of rock units formed during the Aptian are:
Antlers Formation, Cedar Mountain Formation, Cloverly Formation, Elrhaz Formation, Jiufotang Formation, Little Atherfield, Mazong Shan, Potomac Formation, Santana Formation, Twin Mountains Formation, Xinminbao Group and Yixian Formation.

See also
Aptian extinction

References

Notes

Literature
; 2004: A Geologic Time Scale 2004, Cambridge University Press.
; 1842: Paléontologie française: Terrains crétacés, vol. ii.

External links
GeoWhen Database - Aptian
Mid-Cretaceous timescale, at the website of the subcommission for stratigraphic information of the ICS

 
05
Geological ages
Cretaceous geochronology